Lamia Chraïbi, is a Franco–Moroccan film producer. She is best known as the producer of critically acclaimed films Mimosas, Jahilya and Urgent.

Personal life
After completing her studies in audiovisual communication management in France at Valenciennes, she started her professionnel career.

Career
She continued to work 9 years for various Parisian productions. In 2011, she founded the production company 'Moon a Deal Films' located in Paris, after that she founded 'La Prod' production company in 2007 in Casablanca. 

In 2016, she co-produced the film Mimosas with Oliver Laxe. The film received critical acclaim and later won the Grand Prize of the Critics’ Week at the Cannes Film Festival in 2016. Then she produced the film Tegnap directed by Balint Kenyeres. The film was premiered at Locarno Film Festival. In 2018, she produced Achoura, a Moroccan fantasy film directed by Talal Selhami. The film became the Best Film Award at Hardline Festival as well as received Special Mention of the Jury at Sitges Fantastic Film Festival.

In 2019, she produced the television series Meskoun, which was initiated as a pan-Arab genre-bending series with Moroccan filmmaker Hicham Lasri.

Filmography

See also
 Arts in Marrakech (AiM) International Biennale

References

External links
 

Living people
Moroccan people by ethnic or national origin
French film producers
Year of birth missing (living people)